The 1974 Wyoming gubernatorial election took place on November 5, 1974. Incumbent Republican Stanley Hathaway chose to retire than run for a third term as Governor of Wyoming. Former Democratic State Representative Edgar Herschler defeated former Republican State Senator Dick Jones.

Democratic primary

Candidates
Edgar Herschler, former State Representative
Harry Leimback, State Senator
John J. Rooney, former State Representative and nominee for governor in 1970

Republican primary

Candidates
Dick Jones, former State Senator
Malcolm Wallop, State Senator
Roy Peck, State Senator
Clarence Brimmer, Wyoming Attorney General

Results

References

Wyoming
1974
1974 Wyoming elections